Düppenweiler is a village in Germany that belongs to the federal state of Saarland. It is a district of the municipal of Beckingen in the county of Merzig-Wadern. The village counts 3,300 inhabitants and consists of 1.254 ha land, while approximately 507 ha of it is woodland.

History
The first official document of Düppenweiler is from 1153 and it mentions Düppenweiler as Villari. In 1335, Düppenweiler is mentioned as Duppinwilre for the first time. Excavations show that in former times Düppenweiler had a pottery, which explains where the word "Düppen" comes from. ("Düppen" in dialect means something like pot)

Twin towns
 Étain (France)

Sights and Culture
Museums
Ancient copper mine "Grube Düppenweiler".

Churches
In the center of the village you can find the parish church St. Leodegar. Besides the parish church there is also the Valentin chapel that is situated out of the center.

Gallery

References

External links

 Düppenweiler official website

Villages in Saarland
Former municipalities in Saarland